The Women's Scratch is one of the 6 women's events at the 2006 UCI Track Cycling World Championships, held in Bordeaux, France.

20 Cyclists from 20 countries participated in the contest. Because of the number of entries, there were no qualification rounds for this discipline. Consequently, the event was run direct to the final.

Final
The Final and only race was run at 14:30 on April 16. The competition consisted on 40 laps, making a total of 10 km.

References

Women's scratch
UCI Track Cycling World Championships – Women's scratch
UCI